Grifols, S.A. is a Spanish multinational pharmaceutical and chemical manufacturer. Principally a producer of blood plasma-based products, a field in which it is the European leader and largest worldwide, the company also supplies devices, instruments, and reagents for clinical testing laboratories.

Main products
Grifols is the major world supplier of IVIG, albumin, Factor VIII and other plasma-derived products.

Main operations
In 2007 the company had 3.6 million litres per year of blood fractionation capacity from three plants, one at Parets del Vallès near Barcelona in Spain (2.1 million litres per year), another in Los Angeles (1.5 million litres but being expanded to 2.2 million litres), and a site in Clayton, North Carolina. In the United States the company owns 230 plasmapheresis centres, where it collects around 5.8 million litres of plasma per year.

Ownership
Grifols was listed on the Madrid Stock Exchange in May 2006. The stock became part of the IBEX 35 index in January 2008.

History

Grifols' origin lies in the laboratory founded in 1940 in Barcelona by Dr Josep A. Grífols Roig, a hematologist and scientist (although its origin dates back to the Instituto Central de Análisis Clínicos, a company founded in 1909 by Josep Antonio Grífols Roig, which will be a pioneer in Spain in clinical analysis and in the introduction of blood conservation and transfusion techniques). His son, Dr Josep A. Grifols Lucas was the first researcher to publish the plasmapheresis procedure in 1952. The company introduced its liquid IVIG product into the European market in the mid-1990s.

Probitas Pharma, S.A. was incorporated with high limited liability under Spanish law on 22 June 1987; on 27 June 2005 the company changed its name to Grifols, S.A. In 2003 the company acquired certain assets of the Los Angeles-based Alpha Therapeutic (US subsidiary of Mitsubishi Pharma) as the basis of its American expansion. On May 17, 2006, Grifols securities were listed on Spain's Mercado Continuo.

In 2009, CSL Limited attempted to takeover Talecris Biotherapeutics (the former plasma business of Bayer HealthCare LLC, Biological Products Division) for $3,1 billion but was stopped by the Federal Trade Commission. On June 1, 2011, a year after announcing the $4 billion deal, Grifols completed a takeover of Talecris Biotherapeutics, headquartered in Research Triangle Park in North Carolina, with over 2000 employees.

Grifols acquired the blood transfusion diagnostics unit from Novartis in 2013 as a "platform for global expansion".  This unit is based in Emeryville, California and was a part of Chiron acquired by Novartis in 2006.

In 2015, the company acquired a 45% stake in Alkahest as part of planned co-development of "plasma-based products for the treatment of cognitive decline in aging and disorders of the CNS, including Alzheimer's." In 2020 Grifols acquired the remaining stock of Alkahest “bringing its ownership of Alkahest to 100%”.

In December 2016, Grifols acquired Hologics  interest in their existing joint blood screening unit for $1.85 billion

Romanian immunoglobin supply collusion
In February 2022, Biotest AG and four other companies were fined by the Romanian Competition Council for having limited or interrupted the supply of essential immunoglobins with the goal of pressuring the government into removing a tax on their blood products from 2015 to 2018. Biotest was acquired by Grifols in April 2022.

References

Further reading 
 http://openaccess.uoc.edu/webapps/o2/bitstream/10609/13101/1/GRIFOLS%20Factores%20Competitividad%20a%20Largo%20Plazo.pdf

External links

Companies listed on the Nasdaq
Pharmaceutical companies of Spain
Pharmaceutical companies established in 1940
Manufacturing companies based in Barcelona
IBEX 35
Companies listed on the Madrid Stock Exchange
Spanish brands
Spanish companies established in 1940
Multinational companies headquartered in Spain